Link Up & Suede is the debut EP by NxWorries, the Los Angeles-based duo of hip hop producer Knxwledge and R&B vocalist Anderson .Paak. The EP was released on December 4, 2015 under Stones Throw Records, and was supported by two singles: "Suede", the breakthrough song which earned .Paak an invitation to Dr. Dre’s Compton sessions, and "Link Up", which premiered on Zane Lowe's Beats 1 radio show on December 1, 2015.

"Suede" was selected as one of NPR Music's "Favorite Songs of 2015".
The EP also includes "Droogs", a Knxwledge remake of Anderson .Paak's "Drugs" taken from his Venice album, along with two instrumental bonus beats. Link Up & Suede serves as a precursor to the duo's full-length debut album, Yes Lawd!.

Track listing

Personnel
 Cole M.G.N. – mixing
 Eric Coleman – photography
 Dave Cooley – mastering
 Jeff Jank – design
 Knxwledge – producer
 Anderson Paak – vocalist and producer
 NxWorries – primary artist
 Dewey Saunders – illustrations

References 

2015 debut EPs
EPs by American artists
Contemporary R&B EPs
Hip hop EPs
Anderson .Paak albums
NxWorries albums
Collaborative albums
Stones Throw Records EPs